Honeymoon (foaled 1943 in California) was an American Thoroughbred race horse who was the first California-bred filly to surpass the $100,000 mark in earnings and who retired with earnings of $387,760. The June 22, 1946 issue of the Los Angeles Times called Honeymoon the "best filly ever bred in California."

Background
Honeymoon was bred and raced by Hollywood movie mogul Louis B. Mayer and was trained by Graceton Philpot.

Racing career
After an outstanding three-year-old campaign in which Honeymoon won seven important California stakes races she was sold for $135,000 in February 1947 as part of Mayer's dispersal sale. Her new owner was W-L Ranch Co., a racing partnership of two other high-profile Hollywood individuals, Harry Warner and Mervyn Le Roy.

In early 1949 a foot injury severely hampered Honeymoon's racing career and after an unsuccessful comeback in 1950 she was retired.

Retirement and breeding record
As a broodmare she produced just three foals. However, her daughter Honey's Gem was a quality runner whose wins included the 1959 Milady Handicap, the 1959 Beverly Handicap in which she set a North American record of 1:34 flat for a mile on dirt, and the 1960 Ramona Handicap. Honeymoon's son, Honey's Alibi, was a multiple graded stakes race winner who was the damsire of the great Dahlia, an international champion and U.S. Racing Hall of Fame inductee.

Harry Warner died in July 1958 and his estate sold off his racing interests in early 1959. As part of the dispersal sale, Honeymoon was purchased for $20,000 by Thomas A. Miller of La Jolla, California.

Honors
Following its creation, in 1988 Honeymoon was inducted in the California Thoroughbred Hall of Fame. In 1956 Hollywood Park Racetrack, the site of a number of her wins, renamed the Sea Breeze Stakes in her honor.

Pedigree

References

 Honeymoon's pedigree and partial racing stats
 Photo of Honeymoon at Thoroughbred Heritage

1943 racehorse births
Racehorses bred in California
Racehorses trained in the United States
Thoroughbred family 8-h